The flag of Sakhalin Oblast shows the white outline of Sakhalin Island and the Kuril Islands on a faded turquoise field. It was adopted on 28 November 1995.

References 

Sakhalin
Sakhalin Oblast
Flags introduced in 1995
1995 establishments in Russia